Nanosensors is a brand of SPM and AFM probes for atomic force microscopy (AFM) and scanning probe microscopy (SPM).

History 
Basic research at IBM led to the development of the basic technologies necessary for batch processing of silicon SPM and AFM probes using bulk micromachining.

In 1993 Nanosensors became the first commercialized SPM and AFM probes worldwide. The development and introduction of batch processing to produce AFM probes contributed to the introduction of the Atomic Force Microscope into the high tech industry. In recognition of this achievement, Nanosensors has been discerned the Dr.-Rudolf-Eberle Innovation Award of the German State of Baden-Württemberg in 1995, the Innovation Prize of the German Industry  in 1995 as well as the Innovation Award of the Förderkreis für die Mikroelektronik e.V. in 1999.

In 2002, Nanosensors was acquired by and integrated into Switzerland-based NanoWorld. It is still an independent business unit.

Significance 
Researchers have developed a large array of operating modes and methods for Scanning probe microscopy and Atomic Force Microscopy. Independently of the method, their use and application requires essentially a versatile SPM- or AFM-instrument which must be equipped with a method-specific SPM or AFM probe.

As Nanosensors supplies SPM- or AFM-users worldwide with the broadest choice of SPM or AFM probes, some therefore consider this company a "giant" of this industry.

Nanosenors is frequently cited as the supplier of the SPM or AFM probes in nanotechnology research papers (see below) – reflecting its market position and that often it is the only commercial source for these products worldwide.

Products

AFM Probe Series

PointProbePlus 
The PointProbePlus series is directly based on the technology originally developed and commercialized by Nanosensors in 1993. The original PointProbe technology has been upgraded to the PointProbePlus technology in 2004 yielding a reduced variation of tip shape and increased reproducibility of images. It is manufactured from highly doped monocrystalline silicon. The tip is pointing into the <100> crystal direction.
 PointProbePlus XY-Alignment Series & Alignment Chip
 PointProbePlus Silicon MFM Probe Series
 SuperSharpSilicon
 High Aspect Ratio AFM probes

AdvancedTEC 
The tip of the AdvancedTEC AFM probe series protrudes from the end of the cantilever and is visible through the optical system of the atomic force microscope. This visibility from the top allows the operator of the microscope to position the tip of this AFM probe at the point of interest.
 Akiyama-Probe

Applications 
 Non-contact mode / tapping mode microscopy
 Force modulation microscopy
 Contact Mode
 Electrostatic force microscopy, Electrical measurement
 Magnetic force microscopy
 Lateral force microscopy
 Trench measurement
 Nanoindentation
 Self-sensing and self-actuating Akiyama probe (A-Probe) for dynamic mode atomic force microscopy (AFM)
 Tipless cantilevers for probe modification

Accessories 
 Transfer Standards
 Calibration standards
 Alignment Chip

References

External links 
 

Nanotechnology companies
Technology companies of Switzerland
Manufacturing companies of Switzerland
Companies based in Neuchâtel